Gary Tierney (born 19 March 1986 in Bellshill) is a football player, who played for Heart of Midlothian F.C. and Airdrie United

Playing career

Hearts

Tierney made his professional debut on 16 May 2004, in a 3–2 win for Hearts against Motherwell. He also made a substitute appearance on the final day of the 2004–05 season, in a 2–0 defeat at Aberdeen. Tierney made one appearance in the 2005–06 season, in a Scottish League Cup win over Queen's Park.

Airdrie
Tierney signed for Airdrie United after being given a free transfer by Hearts in July 2006. He did not make many appearances for Airdrie United, and in January 2007 he was put out on loan for the rest of the season to Forfar Athletic, making his final professional appearance in a 9–1 defeat by Morton.

Tierney was released by Airdrie in 2007.

References 

1986 births
Living people
Scottish footballers
Association football defenders
Heart of Midlothian F.C. players
Airdrieonians F.C. players
Forfar Athletic F.C. players
English Football League players
Scottish Football League players